Ausma Malik (born ) is a Canadian politician elected to Toronto City Council in the 2022 municipal election for Ward 10 Spadina—Fort York. Malik became the first hijab-wearing Muslim woman to be elected to public office in Canada when she served as a Toronto District School Board trustee from 2014 to 2018, and is also the first Toronto city councillor to wear a hijab.

Early life and career 
In 2013, Malik earned her Bachelor of Arts with honours from St. Michael's College at the University of Toronto, where she majored in international studies and doubled minored in history and political science. 

At the University of Toronto, Malik participated in student activism. In 2006, Malik attended a protest outside the American consulate in Toronto against civilian deaths caused by the Israel Defense Forces during the 2006 Lebanon War. In 2007, she was a member of the Canadian Federation of Students's Task Force on the Needs of Muslim Students, which published a report based on about failures to properly accommodate Muslim postsecondary students in respect to food choice, prayer space, religious holidays, and racial abuse.

Before entering politics herself, she worked on education policy for the Ontario New Democratic Party (NDP), as a labour organizer in the Association of Management, Administrative and Professional Crown Employees of Ontario, and as a staffer at the Stephen Lewis Foundation.

Municipal politics

School trustee 
In 2014, Malik was elected as a Toronto District School Board trustee for Ward 10 with 40% of the vote. Her election made her the first hijab-wearing Muslim woman elected to public office in Canada. During the campaign, Malik was the subject of an anonymous Islamophobic campaign which distributed fliers claiming she supported the Toronto 18 terror plot, Sharia law, and Hezbollah. During a ward trustee candidates debate, a small group of men interrupted her closing remarks by shouting that she was a "Jew hater" and "Hezbollah terrorist", eventually forcing her to abandon her closing statement and leave through a back door. 

During the 2018 Toronto municipal election, Malik registered to run in one of the downtown wards being split from Trinity—Spadina. Incumbent councillor Joe Cressy planned to jointly campaign with her while running in the other half of his old ward, but Premier Doug Ford reduced the number of wards from 47 to 25. This eliminated the ward Malik planned to run in, and she ended her campaign. Malik did not run for re-election as a TDSB trustee and her term ended in 2018.

In January 2020, Malik was the keynote speaker at the University of Toronto's 2020 Next Steps Conference. In July 2022, Malik went on unpaid leave as a director of social engagement at the Atkinson Foundation to run for Toronto City Council.

Toronto City Council 
Joe Cressy, who was elected to represent the new Ward 10 Spadina—Fort York in 2018, did not run in the 2022 Toronto municipal election. Malik entered the race and was endorsed by the progressive advocacy group Progress Toronto, a registered third party in the municipal election, as well as by a number of NDP members of Provincial Parliament (MPPs). On October 24, 2022, Malik was elected to Toronto City Council. She is set to take office on November 15.

Malik is the first Toronto city councillor to wear a hijab.

References

External links 
 Official website

Living people
1980s births
Toronto city councillors
University of Toronto alumni
Women municipal councillors in Canada
Women in Ontario politics
Canadian Muslims
Toronto District School Board trustees
Canadian politicians of Pakistani descent